Christian d'Oriola (3 October 1928 – 29 October 2007) was a French fencer. He was a cousin of the Olympic equestrian Pierre Jonquères d'Oriola. 
 
D'Oriola took part in the 1948, 1952, 1956 and 1960 Olympics, serving as the Olympic flag bearer for France in 1960. Between 1947 and 1958 he won four gold and two silver medals at Summer Olympics and eight world titles in the foil. At the 1960 Olympics he also competed in the team épée, and in 1970, aged 42, won the French national title in this event. In 1972, he was awarded the French Legion of Honor. After retiring from competitions he acted as a fencing judge and served as vice-president of the French Fencing Federation.

References

Sources

External links

 
 
 

1928 births
2007 deaths
Sportspeople from Perpignan
French male épée fencers
French male foil fencers
Olympic fencers of France
Fencers at the 1948 Summer Olympics
Fencers at the 1952 Summer Olympics
Fencers at the 1956 Summer Olympics
Fencers at the 1960 Summer Olympics
Olympic gold medalists for France
Olympic silver medalists for France
Olympic medalists in fencing
Medalists at the 1948 Summer Olympics
Medalists at the 1952 Summer Olympics
Medalists at the 1956 Summer Olympics
Mediterranean Games gold medalists for France
Mediterranean Games medalists in fencing
Fencers at the 1951 Mediterranean Games
21st-century French people
20th-century French people